Mitch Anderson is a Romanian-born American film director, producer, writer, researcher and editor. He is the only son of former political dissidents of the Stalinist era. His first film, The World Without US, explores what might happen if the United States were to leave the international arena, rescind its global reach and return to being a non-interventionist nation.
His second film, China's Century of Humiliation, examines how both Chinese and Western societies evolved based on their Confucian and Christian ideologies, respectively. His third documentary, The Men Who Lost China, explores how China's current foreign policy can be traced back to US involvement in the 1911 Chinese Revolution and the Western attitude to China after the First World War.

Filmography
 The World Without US (2008)
 China's Century of Humiliation (2011)
 The Men Who Lost China (2013)

References

External links

1967 births
Living people
Romanian emigrants to the United States
American documentary filmmakers
American film directors
American film producers
American male screenwriters
Romanian film directors
Romanian film producers
Romanian screenwriters
Place of birth missing (living people)
Date of birth missing (living people)